Anthaxomorphus is a genus of beetles in the family Buprestidae, containing the following species:

 Anthaxomorphus aethiopicus Obenberger, 1924
 Anthaxomorphus africanus Obenberger, 1922
 Anthaxomorphus bellamyi Kalashian, 1993
 Anthaxomorphus bourgainvillensis Williams & Weir, 1992
 Anthaxomorphus burgeoni Thery, 1930
 Anthaxomorphus coeruleus Thery, 1930
 Anthaxomorphus collarti Thery, 1930
 Anthaxomorphus coomani Thery, 1943
 Anthaxomorphus corporaali Obenberger, 1924
 Anthaxomorphus cossyphoides Thery, 1947
 Anthaxomorphus femoralis Deyrolle, 1864
 Anthaxomorphus granulosus Deyrolle, 1864
 Anthaxomorphus hargreavesi Thery, 1933
 Anthaxomorphus lacustris Obenberger, 1924
 Anthaxomorphus maindroni Thery, 1943
 Anthaxomorphus oblongus Deyrolle, 1864
 Anthaxomorphus occidentalis Obenberger, 1924
 Anthaxomorphus papuanus Deyrolle, 1864
 Anthaxomorphus paracoeruleus Bellamy, 1987
 Anthaxomorphus paradoxa (Obenberger, 1921)
 Anthaxomorphus philippinensis Fisher, 1921
 Anthaxomorphus queenslandicus Williams & Weir, 1992
 Anthaxomorphus raffrayi Thery, 1930
 Anthaxomorphus roseocupreus Bellamy, 1987
 Anthaxomorphus turneri Thery, 1930

References

Buprestidae genera